Ralph René (August 24, 1933 – December 10, 2008) was an American conspiracy theorist, small press publisher and inventor. René was a vocal proponent of certain Moon landing conspiracy theories. René's last self-published work, a pamphlet he distributed called WTC Lies and Fairy Tales, details his assertions regarding certain 9/11 conspiracy theories.

René appeared frequently in shows produced by The History Channel, National Geographic Channel, Fox television and Showtime. In one such show, The Truth Behind the Moon Landings: Stranger Than Fiction, journalist and former NASA employee James Oberg referred to René and other conspiracy theorists as cultural vandals. René reacted onscreen with amusement and stated that he liked the characterization. René was also featured in an episode of Penn & Teller: Bullshit! covering conspiracy theories. René was introduced as a physicist on the 2001 Fox documentary, Conspiracy Theory: Did We Land on the Moon?, and had  the designation "Author/Scientist" under his picture. However, René admitted in his biography that he did not hold a degree from any university and always referred to himself as "self-taught."

Moon landing conspiracy theories
 
His 1992 self-published book, NASA Mooned America!, details why he felt that the Apollo Moon landings were faked and actually produced from a closed studio.

Other claims
In addition to contending that NASA never sent astronauts to the Moon, René also proposes a number of other ideas René outlined most of these beliefs in his self-published book, The Last Skeptic of Science (1995). The original title of the book, MENSA Lectures (1990), resulted in a lawsuit against him by Mensa who felt he was misappropriating the name of their organization and using it to suggest they backed his beliefs.

Personal life
René referred to himself as an "extra bright kid from the slums." After attending Rutgers University for a time, he dropped out and went to work as a carpenter and millwright. He then continued to pursue his personal interests in structural and mechanical engineering, physics, writing and inventing. René held two patents for simple mechanical tools. He maintained a website that archived many of his past columns and essays on a wide variety of subjects.

Bibliography

Books

Non-fiction

Fiction

Pamphlets

 WTC Lies and Fairy Tales. Passaic, NJ: R. René (2003). .

See also
Astronauts Gone Wild
Bart Sibrel
Bill Kaysing
Squaring the circle

References

External links

1933 births
2008 deaths
9/11 conspiracy theorists
Moon landing conspiracy theorists
American conspiracy theorists
20th-century American male writers